Gamma Camelopardalis, Latinized from γ Camelopardalis, is a suspected wide binary star system in the northern circumpolar constellation of Camelopardalis. With a visual magnitude of 4.66, it is faintly visible to the naked eye. Based upon an annual parallax shift of 9.09 mas as seen from Earth, this star is located about 359 light years from the Sun.

The brighter primary, designated component A, is a white-hued A-type subgiant star with a stellar classification of A2 IVn. It is spinning rapidly with a projected rotational velocity of 205 km/s. This is giving the star an oblate shape with an equatorial bulge that is 17% larger than the polar radius. It has about three times the mass of the Sun and 2.5 times the Sun's radius. The star is radiating 185 times the Sun's luminosity from its photosphere at an effective temperature of 8,892 K.

The magnitude 9.07 secondary, BD+70 260, designated component C, lay at an angular separation of 106.00 arc seconds along a position angle of 85°, as of 2011. Component B is a magnitude 12.40 visual companion at a separation of 56.30 arc seconds along position angle 247°.

References

External links
 HR 1148
 Image Gamma Camelopardalis

A-type subgiants
Double stars
Camelopardalis, Gamma
Camelopardalis (constellation)
BD+70 0259
023401
017959
1148